Robert Bull Bates (1789 – October 7, 1841) was an American lawyer and politician in the U.S. state of Vermont. He served as the 29th and 31st Speaker of the Vermont House of Representatives.

Early life
Bates was born in Salisbury, Connecticut in 1789 and was raised in Richmond, Massachusetts. He studied law in Delaware and settled in Middlebury, Vermont in 1813, where he practiced law in partnership with Daniel Chipman.  During the War of 1812 Bates was one of two aides de camp for the commander of the Vermont Militia's 3rd Division.

Active in the Episcopal Church, Bates was a delegate to the Vermont diocese's annual convention in 1826.

Political career
A Democratic-Republican, Bates served in several local offices, including Justice of the Peace. He represented Middlebury in the Vermont House of Representatives on several occasions, and was Speaker of the State House from 1826 to 1829 and from 1830 to 1831.

In 1831 Bates was an unsuccessful candidate for the United States House of Representatives, losing to William Slade.

Bates later moved to Albany, New York, and then to New York City where he practiced law until his death on October 7, 1841.

References

1789 births
1841 deaths
People from Salisbury, Connecticut
People from Richmond, Massachusetts
People from Middlebury, Vermont
Vermont lawyers
Vermont Democratic-Republicans
Members of the Vermont House of Representatives
Speakers of the Vermont House of Representatives
American militiamen in the War of 1812
19th-century American politicians
19th-century American lawyers